Jean-Nicolas Laverlochère (December 6, 1812 in St. Georges d'Espérance, Grenoble, France – October 4, 1884 in Témiscaming, Quebec) was a French missionary in Canada. He began his religious life as a lay brother in the Congregation of the Oblates, but feeling called to evangelize the natives of Canada, he was allowed to study for the priesthood, and was ordained on May 5, 1844 at L'Acadie, near Montreal. He was a missionary in the Saguenay district from 1844 to 1847, at Abitibi, Moose Factory, and other posts on Hudson Bay from 1847 to 1863, at Plattsburgh, New York from 1863 to 1868, and on Lake Timiskaming from 1868 to his death in 1884. He laboured for the conversion of the native tribes. His reputation as a zealous missionary spread throughout Catholic Europe to such an extent that he was ultimately recognized as the Apostle of Hudson Bay. A stroke of palsy interrupted his labours in the course of 1851. He died in 1884 and is buried in the Catholic cemetery in Fort-Témiscamingue.

Laverlochère-Angliers, a municipality in Témiscamingue county, Quebec, founded 1904, was named for him.

Writings
Alone or in collaboration with others, he published a number of devotional books in Maskekon and Cree. His letters in the Annales de la Propagation de la Foi attracted wide attention. He was the author of Mission de la Baie d' Hudson: Lettre de Mgr. l'Evêque de Bytown (n.p., 1848). He also compiled an Algonquin-French dictionary. His manuscripts were left to his successor and companion, the Rev. André Garin.

Bibliography
 Gaston Carrière, Missionnaire sans toit: le P. Jean-Nicolas Laverlochère, O.M.I., 1811-1884. Montreal: Rayonnement, 1963
W. Stewart Wallace, ed., The Encyclopedia of Canada, Vol. IV, Toronto: University Associates of Canada, 1948, p. 5, available here
James Constantine Pilling, Bibliography of the Algonquin Languages. Washington: Government Printing Office, 1891, available here

References

This article incorporates text from the 1913 Catholic Encyclopedia article "Jean-Nicolas Laverlochère" by A.G. Morice, a publication now in the public domain.

1812 births
1884 deaths
French Roman Catholic missionaries
Roman Catholic missionaries in Canada
Roman Catholic missionaries in the United States
People from Abitibi-Témiscamingue
French emigrants to Canada
Immigrants to the Province of Canada
French expatriates in the United States